Alberto Coletti Conti (born 1885, date of death unknown) was an Italian sports shooter. He competed in two events at the 1924 Summer Olympics.

References

External links
 

1885 births
Year of death missing
Italian male sport shooters
Olympic shooters of Italy
Shooters at the 1924 Summer Olympics
People from Anagni
Sportspeople from the Province of Frosinone